Marie-Ève Marleau (born February 12, 1982) is a Canadian Olympic diver from Laval, Quebec. She was born in Labrador City, Newfoundland and Labrador, Canada.

Bio
Marleau started as a gymnast, until switching over to diving.

The 10M synchro diving team of Marie-Ève and Émilie Heymans have won 4 international medals, including gold at the Pan American games in 2007. They also won the silver medal at the 2008 FINA World Cup in Beijing.

She finished in 7th place for Canada in the Diving at the 2008 Summer Olympics - Women's 10 metre platform event at the 2008 Summer Olympics.

References

External reference
 
 Bio at NBColympics.com 
 Bio at Diving.ca 
 

1982 births
Living people
Canadian female divers
Olympic divers of Canada
Divers at the 2008 Summer Olympics
Pan American Games gold medalists for Canada
Pan American Games medalists in diving
Divers at the 2003 Pan American Games
Divers at the 2007 Pan American Games
Texas A&M University alumni
Sportspeople from Newfoundland and Labrador
People from Labrador City
Franco-Newfoundlander people
Medalists at the 2007 Pan American Games